Eilema albostriatum is a moth of the subfamily Arctiinae first described by Lars Kühne in 2010. It is found in Namibia and South Africa.

References

Moths described in 2010
albostriatum
Insects of Namibia
Moths of Africa